The Elkhorn Grade Electrification was a project undertaken by Westinghouse in 1913–1915 to electrify a  section of the Norfolk and Western Railway's Bluefield Division in Virginia and West Virginia. Electrification would be extended further in the 1920s and the length of the electrified line would reach  before the N&W abandoned it in 1950.

Background 

In the early twentieth century the Bluefield Division of the Norfolk and Western Railway featured a forbidding two percent average grade. Multiple 2-6-6-2 Class Z1 "Mallet" steam locomotives labored hauling  coal trains up and down the grade.

History 
Working with Westinghouse, the Norfolk and Western electrified a  segment between Bluefield, Virginia and Vivian, West Virginia. The N&W constructed a power plant at Bluestone, West Virginia, along with maintenance shops for the electric locomotives. Substations were located at Bluefield, Vivian, Maybeury, and North Fork. The electrification system was 11 kV at 25 Hz. Aside from the Elkhorn Tunnel the entire system was double or triple track. Including sidings, yard trackage, and branches to coal mines,  were under catenary.

The effect of the electric operation was immediate and measurable. In June 1914 the electrified district handled 272 trains averaging  of coal. Each train required three Class Z1 locomotives. In June 1915, with electric operation only partially implemented, this rose to 397 trains averaging , a 60 percent increase. In normal operation two LC-1 boxcabs could handle each train.

 Vivian–Iaeger
 Welch–Wilcoe

After World War II the N&W decided to abandon electrification on the Bluefield Division. The railroad constructed a  $11.9 million double-track bypass of the Elkhorn Tunnel. The reduced grade eliminated the need for electric traction. The bypass was dedicated on June 26, 1950.

Rolling stock 

To operate under the wires the N&W ordered twelve twin-unit LC-1 boxcab locomotives from Baldwin-Westinghouse. The N&W supplemented these in 1925 with four LC-2 locomotives. The N&W scrapped all sixteen when electrification ended in 1950.

See also 
 Railroad electrification in the United States

Notes

References

Further reading

External links 

 Norfolk and Western Historical Society

Electric railways in Virginia
Electric railways in West Virginia
Norfolk and Western Railway
Rail infrastructure in Virginia
Rail infrastructure in West Virginia